The Race Team Alliance (RTA) is a 501(c)(6) Delaware not-for-profit business organization that consists of 16 NASCAR Cup Series teams as of 2022. The RTA is intended to increase revenues and budget efficiency for NASCAR Cup Series organizations, as well as to make promotional deals, attract sponsors, market the sports teams and drivers and to present and work with NASCAR in a single voice. It was established on July 7, 2014 and was originally comprised nine teams. The current chairman of the RTA is Rob Kauffman, co-owner of Chip Ganassi Racing, a former team in the alliance.

History

NASCAR and union-like organizations
NASCAR has always in the past had a negative view of and has resisted union like organizations and the formation of them. In 1965, the sport's pioneers Curtis Turner and Tim Flock were banned after trying to form a union among the drivers and get the Teamsters to represent them, although both were later reinstated. In 1969, NASCAR stars formed the PDA (Professional Drivers Association), led by Richard Petty. Shortly after a boycott of the 1969 Talladega 500 over track conditions the union disbanded, with NASCAR never publicly acknowledging the organization's existence or punishing drivers involved in it.

Formation of the RTA
In 2014, the top race teams in the sport created the Race Team Alliance. The organization structured similar to the former FOTA in Formula One.

Much like with union-like organizations of the past, NASCAR took a negative view with chairman Brian France calling it the "worst thing we could ever do". NASCAR, through president Mike Helton, assured the media that there is no animosity between the RTA and the sanctioning body.

Actions
In May 2018, Jonathan Marshall was appointed as the organization's executive director. The RTA also helped with the organizing of NASCAR Heat Pro League, the esports series of the NASCAR Heat video game series, as well as the idea of the moving the Cup Series car numbers to the front of the center of door from the 2022 season. (A previous experiment, moving the car number rearwards, was tried at the 2020 NASCAR All-Star Race.)

In November 2022, reports surfaced that the RTA considered holding exhibition races sanctioned by themselves instead of NASCAR. The proposal, fueled by the issue over money the teams received from television broadcasting rights, has resulted in concerns about a potential split similar to American open-wheel car racing experienced from 1996 to 2008, although a clause in the agreement with NASCAR and RTA (set to expire in 2024, coinciding with new television arrangements scheduling to take effect) prohibits the RTA from creating a competing racing series.

Charter system
In advance of the 2016 NASCAR Sprint Cup Series season, the RTA played an integral role in forming an agreement between NASCAR and the various NASCAR Cup Series competitors on a charter system which would guarantee full-time license holders automatic entrance into every race of the season for nine years. Charters which are transferable were granted to full-time Cup Series teams that had been active in a full-time capacity since at least the 2013 NASCAR Sprint Cup Series season. There are a total of 36 charters, and a new total starting field in each race of 40 providing four "open" spots on the weekly race grid. Failure to field a car, or finishing in bottom three in owner points' standings for three consecutive seasons, results in the loss of that charter, at NASCAR's discretion.

This action was driven by the RTA in an effort to increase the value of the current full-time teams. Two charters granted to the since-defunct Michael Waltrip Racing were sold for over a million dollars apiece to Joe Gibbs Racing and Stewart Haas Racing. Charters can also be leased, as in the case of Trackhouse Racing Team leasing a charter from Spire Motorsports for 2021 before acquiring Chip Ganassi Racing's NASCAR operations. In accordance with NASCAR's four-car rule, no organization may possess more than four charters.

The charter system has been criticized as increasing entry barrier for new teams to enter the Cup Series while favoring larger, established teams with multiple cars and allowing smaller ones possessing charters to stagnate on-track. Germain Racing driver Ty Dillon (whose team shut down at the end of 2020 season) claimed that charter system made single-car teams difficult to survive. Following the announcement that Leavine Family Racing was shutting down at the end of the 2020 season, team owner Bob Leavine claimed that the team did not get the most of the charter for what he paid for it. Larry McReynolds has stated on NASCAR Race Hub that he would like to disband the RTA, along with drivers and team owners' council. Further criticism of the charter system surrounded the 2021 Bluegreen Vacations Duels when Dillon failed to qualify for that year's Daytona 500 after he lost to Ryan Preece (another driver driving for a non-chartered team), even though both had finished ahead of several slower chartered cars.

Members

Current members

Former members

References

External links
 Official website

Stock car racing
NASCAR
NASCAR teams
Organizations based in North Carolina
Sports organizations established in 2014
2014 establishments in North Carolina